"She's the One" is a song by British rock band World Party. It was written and produced by Karl Wallinger for World Party's fourth studio album, Egyptology (1997). The song won an Ivor Novello Award in 1997. It was featured in the 1997 movie The Matchmaker and the 1998 movie The Big Hit. World Party performed the song live on British TV show, Later... with Jools Holland in 1998. Robbie Williams recorded a cover of the song in 1998, which reached number one in the UK Singles Chart.

Robbie Williams version

English singer Robbie Williams covered "She's the One" and released it as a single on 8 November 1999. In most countries, the song was released alone, but in the United Kingdom and New Zealand, it was released as a double A-side single with "It's Only Us". It was the fourth single from his second studio album, I've Been Expecting You (1998), and was also included on his first compilation album, The Ego Has Landed (1999). The song became Williams' second number-one single in the United Kingdom.

The song went on to win a number of awards around the world, including a 2000 Brit Awards for British Single of the Year and British Video of the Year in 2000, and it also won a Capital Radio Award for Best Single.

Wallinger's response
The song's producers, Guy Chambers and Steve Power, used the drummer and bassist of World Party's touring band (neither of whom played on the World Party version) to perform the backing track for Williams, resulting in a very similar-sounding cover. World Party's frontman and songwriter Karl Wallinger was not made aware that a cover was going to be released using his own band. When the song became a hit, and after having experienced a near-fatal brain aneurysm around the time of the song's release, Wallinger stated that he experienced "ongoing bitterness", going on to say that "the song had a much better time than me, popping off to the Brits while I was at home eating crackers dipped in water".

When introducing the song in live performances, Williams often claims that it is one of the best songs he's ever written, despite not actually having written the song. This culminated in a telephone outburst from the song's actual writer, Wallinger, to Chambers, stating "Your fucking friend Robbie Williams. Tell him from me that he's a cunt". Williams has never publicly acknowledged that "She's the One" is a cover of a World Party track although 20 years later, in a 2019 commercial for his album The Christmas Present, Williams states that he wrote the song for Amazon Alexa. The device subsequently states that Williams did not write She's the One, to which Robbie admits "no, I didn't".

Sasha Swift and Alex Thomas of Titles Mean Nothing suggest that Williams' cover of "She's the One" went on "boost and elevate" Williams' post-Take That career, but had Williams acknowledged that his single was a cover of a World Party song, this would have substantially boosted the career of Wallinger too.

Music video
In the video Williams is a coach to an ice skating couple—portrayed by Pamela O'Connor and Jonathon O'Dougherty—but when the male skater gets injured during practice, Williams takes his place for the final and gets the highest scores. The video ends with Williams and the female skater celebrating with the male skater, who had been watching from the sidelines. Philip Woods, a 10-year-old figure skater from Chelmsford, played the young Williams in a flashback. The UK version of the video features commentary by Barry Davies.

Track listings
UK CD1
 "It's Only Us" – 2:50
 "She's the One" – 4:18
 "Coke & Tears" – 4:24
 "It's Only Us" (video)

UK CD2
 "She's the One" – 4:18
 "It's Only Us" – 2:50
 "Millennium" (live at Slane Castle) – 4:40
 "She's the One" (video)

UK cassette single
 "She's the One" – 4:18
 "It's Only Us" – 2:50
 "Millennium" (live at Slane Castle) – 4:40

Credits and personnel
Credits are lifted from the I've Been Expecting You album booklet.

Studio
 Mastered at Metropolis Mastering (London, England)

Personnel

 Karl Wallinger – writing
 Robbie Williams – vocals
 Gary Nuttall – background vocals
 Steve McEwan – background vocals, acoustic guitar, electric guitar
 David Catlin-Birch – bass guitar
 Guy Chambers – piano, production, arrangement
 Chris Sharrock – drums
 London Session Orchestra – orchestra
 Gavyn Wright – orchestra leader
 Nick Ingman – orchestral arrangement
 Steve Power – production, recording, mixing, programming
 Steve McNichol – programming
 Steve Price – orchestral engineering
 Tony Cousins – mastering

Charts and certifications

Weekly charts

Year-end charts

Certifications

References

External links
 World Party website

1997 songs
1999 singles
1990s ballads
World Party songs
Robbie Williams songs
Brit Award for British Single
Number-one singles in Greece
Number-one singles in Scotland
Pop ballads
Rock ballads
Songs written by Karl Wallinger
UK Singles Chart number-one singles